Issel is an Italian surname, and the name of a town in France.  It can refer to:

Places
 Oude IJssel, river in Germany and the Netherlands
 Issel, Aude, France

People
 Saint Issel, 6th-century Welsh saint
 Alberto Issel (1848–1926), Italian painter
 Arturo Issel (1842–1922), Italian geologist and malacologist
 Dan Issel (born 1948), American basketball player
 Kim Issel (born 1967), Canadian ice hockey right winger
 Germán Issel (born 1986), Argentinian entrepreneur

Italian-language surnames